The First Americans Museum (FAM) is a museum in Oklahoma City, Oklahoma, U.S. It was previously known as the American Indian Cultural Center and Museum. It officially opened on September 18, 2021.

Background
The center was initiated in the 1990s and previously was named the American Indian Cultural Center and Museum.
Construction began in 2006, was interrupted in 2012 when state funding ran out, but resumed in 2019, after the responsibility for the museum was transferred from the State of Oklahoma to Oklahoma City.

Mission 
The mission of First Americans Museum is, "To serve as a dynamic center promoting awareness and educating the broader public about the unique cultures, diversity, history, contributions, and resilience of the First American Nations in Oklahoma today."

Staff 
The FAM's executive director is James Pepper Henry (Kaw/Muscogee). Deputy director is Shoshana Wasserman (Thlopthlocco Muscogee). Chief curator is Heather Ahtone (Choctaw/Chickasaw). Loretta Barrett Oden (Potawatomi) is a culinary architect in the museum's on-site Thirty Nine Restaurant.

See also 
 Center of the American Indian, Native-American led intertribal museum in Oklahoma City, active from 1978 to 1992

References

External links 
 

Museums in Oklahoma City
Native American museums in Oklahoma
Native Americans in Oklahoma City